The history of Azerbaijani animation is so far a nearly unexplored field for Western film theory and history. Most of Azerbaijan's production of animation for cinema and television was created during Soviet times. A lengthy history interlocks between the art, politics and the ever-changing economy.

History

Soviet era
Creation of animation film in Azerbaijan goes back to the early 1930s. In 1933, employees of Azerbaijanfilm studio  purchased necessary materials from Moscow. The same year, they used technical animation in production of the documentaries Lokbatan and Oil Symphony’. In 1938, the educational film Jat was first full length work where animation fully used.

After release of Jat film, a group of art artists decided to make an animated film in the film studio for the first time. The theme for the film was taken from Azerbaijani folk tales. The scenery called "Abbasın bədbəxtliyi" (Abbas's unhappiness) was written by A.Papov. The animation film was directed by E.Dikaryov. The scenes of the animation were drawn by artists G. Khalykov, J.Zeynalov, M.Magomayev and A.Mirzayev. The film operator was Q.Yegiazarov.

The film studio used the animated drawings in the production of hundreds of scientific, documentary and documentary films. In the creation of these films, actors J. Zeynalov, M.Rafiev, A.Akhundov, N.Mammadov, B. Aliyev, and A.Milov took parts.

1960s 
In 1968, after restoration of animation workshop located in Azerbaijanfilm film studio named after Jafar Jabbarli, director A. Isgandarov paid special attention to the usage of the workshop and training of the staff for animation films, as well as the production of animated films.

In the same year, the Azerbaijanfilm film studio named after Jafar Jabbarly decided to create a new national multiplication film after a long break.

In the late 1960s, Azerbaijanfilm studio was provided with necessary facilities to make animations. A group of 20 artists was created, a special course opened to learn secrets of the animation. On February 28, 1969, production of animation film Jyrtdan motived by the same-titled folk story was completed. Jyrtdan was the first film made after restoration of the animation film shop at the film studio. In 1969, the animation was released and for long time was shown at the cinemas. The production of Jyrtdan started the second era of history of animation film in Azerbaijan. The scenery of the Jyrtdan was written by Alla Akhundova. Most part of the animation was filmed under the direction of Aghanaghi Akhundov. The rest was directed by documentary director Yalchin Efendiyev, and producer, artist and multiplier Nazim Mammadov.

1970s 
In the 1970s, over 20 animation films were produced in the animation film section of the Azerbaijanfilm studio. In 1970, animators made 3 animation films, two of which were microfilms Bear and mouse and Lion and bull under Seyid Azim Shirvani's same-titled work. The latter was included in all-union anthology ‘Kaleidoscope-71’. It was the first full-featured animated film shot by the Azerbaijanfilm after the restoration of the animated film workshop. It was released in the 1970s.

Nazim Mammadov laid the foundation for multiplication in Azerbaijan with "Bear and the Mouse". He was the director and artist, as well as the animator of the film. The film talks about not to forget kindness and goodness.

In 1973 Nazim Mammadov returned to the Jyrtdan`s topic a few years later, giving a personal appearance to the film calling it “Cırtdanın yeni macəraları" (Jyrtdan's new adventures). The film is intended for small children. In the film folklore's fantastic motives and modernity are organically interconnected.

The film "Şahzadə - qara qızıl" (Prince - Black Gold) also was made by director Nazim  Mammadov and B. Aliyev in 1974, director. The animation poetically talks about extracting black gold from the bottom of the earth and sea.

Animated films “Günlərin bir günü..." (One day) (1975), "Cınqıl, sazım, cınqıl" (Dingil, my saz, dingil) (1976), and "Pəncə..., qulaq... Palaz... Tikan" (Paw…Ear…Carpet…Thorn) (1976) which were directed by M.Panahi instills moral features and touches edifying issues.

The animation "Şah və xidmətçi" (King and servant) (1976, dir. Nazim Mammadov) was animated under Nizami Ganjavi same-titled work.  The film talks about faithful servant and ruthless, cruel king.

The animated films "Toplan və onun kölgəsi" (Toplan and its shadow) (1977), “Sonrakı peşmançılıq" (Latecomer disappointment)  (1978) and "Sehirlənmiş küpə" (Magical jug) (1979) which were directed by Nazim Mammadov are about the importance to be noble, hard-working, respectful to adults, and other human qualities.

The animation film “Arzunu yarat" (Create your desire) was directed by F.Gurbanova in 1977. It also instills good quality humans.

In 1970s, director H.Akbarov made 2 animated films “Daş" (Stone) (1977) and "Kirpi balası və alma" (Young hedgehog and apple) (1977). The film “Daş” is intended for adults calling the world`s nations for solidarity, to ban the wars and establish the peace. “Kirpi balası və alma” is about to protect the nature. Animation film ‘Legend of Maiden Tower’ was filmed in 1978 under of folklore`s motives of Azerbaijan.

1980s 
In 1980s, production of animation films continued as animations such as Yaz oyunları (Spring games), Nar ağacının nağılı (Story of pomegranate tree), Xrizantema yarpağı (Chrysanthemum leaf) and Çətin məsələ (Difficult issue) were made. But the artistic quality of Azerbaijani animation films were not at the same level as in the west. There were several reasons for this, mostly due to lack of technical appliances, in particular color.

In the 1980s, 38 films were produced in the film studio. The most famous among them are "Cücələrim" (My chickens) (in the early 1980s), "Meşəyə insan gəlir” (Man is coming to the forest), "Sehirli Ağac" (Magic tree), "Taya", "Dəcəl Dovşan" (Naughty rabbit), "Sandıq", "Sən belə cumbulusan" (You are so small), "Sehirli ləçək" (Magic kerchief), "Uçan zürafə" (Flying Giraffe), "Qəribə əjdaha" (Strange dragon), "Yatmaq vaxtıdır" (Time to sleep), "Balaca çoban" (Little shepherd), "Humayin yuxusu" (Humay`s dream), and "Sakit Yomun macəraları" (Adventures of calm Yon), "Xeyir və Şər" (Good and Evil), "Uşaq və külək" (Child and wind), and "Akvraium" (Aquarium). All these animations have been filmed using application method.

The animated film “Xeyir və Şər" (Good and Evil) based on the motives of N. Ganjavi's same-titled work was made by Nazim Mammadov for adults. The story of the animation film is about the charity of the Good even in the arid desert and enmity of the Evil.

The animated film "Akvarium" (Aquarium) was directed by F. Kurbanova in the same years. It is considered poetic film. The distinctive feature of this cell animated film is participation of an actor in the film. This animation was awarded diploma on nature protection in 1984 in Murmansk.

In later 1980s, the influence of social-political processes on all the spheres, as well as on creative organizations, and the idea of Azerbaijanfilm transferring into new style gave rise to the independent functioning of the cinema-based unions and departments. The name of the animated film workshop was changed to Azanfilm Creative and Manufacturing Association. (Azanfilm – Azerbaijan Animation Film).

Republic era
After the dissolution of the USSR, the situation for Azerbaijan animators changed dramatically. In the 90s, Azanfilm made 19 animation films, including Bir dəfə haradasa... (Once somewhere...), Oda (Ode), Göyçək Fatma (Lovely Fatma), Karvan (Caravan), Sohbatul-Esmar.

In 1991, cell animation İthaf (Dedication), which was dedicated to the victims of Stalin repression was awarded the diploma of Oberhauzen International Film Festival, the most successful debut prize of Kiev KROK-91 International Animation Film Federation (ASIFA) Festival and the best animation film prize of Vision from East Baku International Film Festival.

In 2000s, Azerbaijani animation entered a new crisis as all channels in Azerbaijan indefinitely postponed funding for all projects. In 2008, Azerbaijani ministry of culture and tourism  celebrated the 75th birthday of Azerbaijani animation.

Azerbaijan Animation Museum 
The Azerbaijan Animation Museum named after Nazim Mammadov was established in 2015 with the support of the Youth Foundation under the President of the Republic of Azerbaijan and the Ministry of Culture and Tourism of Azerbaijan and at the initiative of the Azerbaijani Consulate of Art. The museum is named after Nazim Mammadov, the founder of the Azerbaijani animation film.

Nazim Mammadov has worked for the film studio named after Jafar Jabbarli for many years and became the founder of the Azerbaijani animation. He has also been involved in painting, graphics and illustrations to more than 400 children's books. The creation of the museum is aimed at educating young people about the history of Azerbaijan's animation.

See also 

 Azerbaijanfilm
 Lists of Azerbaijani films

References

External links
List of animated films made by Azerbaijanfilm
List of animated films made by Azerbaijantelefilm

Azerbaijan
Azerbaijan
Azerbaijani animation